Rachid Taoussi ( – born 1959, Sidi Kacem) is a former Moroccan football player and manager.

Club career
Born in Sidi Kacem, Taoussi began his career at age 17 with Union Sidi Kacem as a midfielder.

Coaching career
From 1995 to 2000, Taoussi was the assistant coach of the Morocco national team.

In 1997, Taoussi led the Moroccan Under-20 National Team to the 1997 African Youth Championship title.

On September 22, 2012, Taoussi was appointed as manager of the Morocco national football team, replacing Eric Gerets who was sacked a week earlier. In 2013, Taoussi was sacked and replaced by U20 manager Hassan Benabicha.

Honours

Club
MAS Fez
Coupe du Trône (1): 2011
CAF Confederation Cup (1): 2011
CAF Super Cup (1): 2012

Country
Morocco U20
African Youth Championship (1): 1997

References

External links

Rachid Taoussi at Footballdatabase

1959 births
Living people
Fath Union Sport managers
Moroccan football managers
Fath Union Sport players
union Sidi Kacem players
People from Sidi Kacem
Wydad AC managers
Morocco national football team managers
Raja CA managers
RS Berkane managers
2013 Africa Cup of Nations managers
Association football midfielders
Moroccan footballers
AS FAR (football) managers
Olympique Club de Khouribga managers
Expatriate football managers in Algeria
CR Belouizdad managers
ES Sétif managers
KAC Kénitra managers
Botola managers